Wenquan is a town in and the seat of Yingshan County in extreme eastern Hubei province, China.

Geography

Administrative divisions
, it has 5 residential communities and 49 villages under its administration.  and later as of 2016, Wenquan administered:

References 

Township-level divisions of Hubei